William Dawson (March 17, 1848 – October 12, 1929) was a U.S. Representative from Missouri.

Born in New Madrid, Missouri, Dawson was graduated from Christian Brothers' College in St. Louis, Missouri in 1869.

Dawson was elected sheriff and collector of New Madrid County in 1870 and 1872. He served as a member of the state House of Representatives in 1878–1884. Dawson was elected as a Democrat to the 49th Congress from Missouri's 14th congressional district, serving from March 4, 1885 to March 3, 1887.

He was an unsuccessful candidate for renomination in 1886. He engaged in the land business in New Madrid and served as clerk of the New Madrid County Circuit Court of 1915–1927. He died in New Madrid in 1929 and is interred in Evergreen Cemetery.

References

1848 births
1929 deaths
Democratic Party members of the Missouri House of Representatives
People from New Madrid, Missouri
Missouri sheriffs
County clerks in Missouri
Democratic Party members of the United States House of Representatives from Missouri